Üvarjärv is a lake in Soodi, Võru County, Estonia.

See also
List of lakes of Estonia

Lakes of Estonia